Alfred Pott (30 September 1822 – 28 February 1908) was an English churchman, Archdeacon of Berkshire from 1870 until 1903.

Life
Pott was educated at Eton and Magdalen College, Oxford, where he was president of the Oxford Union. He was ordained Deacon in 1845  and Priest in 1846.

He was the incumbent at St. Agatha, Brightwell-cum-Sotwell and was the Vicar of Clifton Hampden from 1874 until 1882. He was on the governing body of Abingdon School from 1869 to 1902 and Chairman of the Governors from 1869 to 1900.

His son Alfred Percivall Pott was also a clergyman.

References

Notes

1822 births
People educated at Eton College
Alumni of Magdalen College, Oxford
Archdeacons of Berkshire
Presidents of the Oxford Union
1908 deaths
Governors of Abingdon School
People from Brightwell-cum-Sotwell